Arts, Beats & Eats  is a U.S. Labor Day Weekend festival held in Royal Oak, Michigan. Prior to 2010 it was held in downtown Pontiac, Michigan streets in storefront businesses and at the Phoenix Plaza Amphitheatre. The festival is sponsored by local businesses, including Ford, the naming sponsor. Proceeds from Arts, Beats & Eats benefit local charities; an estimated 1.7 million was donated in the first seven years.

A juried arts exhibition, food court, concert stages with local and national acts and a charity preview gala highlight festival programming. In 2005, families were treated to special fun in the Family Village, including the following play zones:

 Wild Kingdom Adventure Tour
 75th Birthday Exhibit
 Kids Talent Quest
 Kids Corner Stage
 Tire Toss Charity Game
 Arts & Crafts Area

Programming begins Friday afternoon and ends Monday evening.

2020 saw a virtual festival.

2021 saw the return of Arts, Beats, and Eats sponsored by Soaring Eagle Casino & Resort.

See also
Tourism in metropolitan Detroit

Notes

External links
 Arts, Beats & Eats

Music festivals in Michigan
Tourist attractions in Oakland County, Michigan